Memphis Underground is a 1969 album by jazz flutist Herbie Mann, that fuses the genres of jazz and rhythm and blues (R&B). While Mann and the other principal soloists (Roy Ayers, Larry Coryell and Sonny Sharrock) were leading jazz musicians, the album was recorded in Chips Moman's American Sound Studio in Memphis, a studio used by many well-known R&B and pop artists. The rhythm section was the house band at American Studios. The recording was engineered and produced by Tom Dowd.

Three of the five songs on the album were covers of songs originally released by soul artists.  "Hold On, I'm Comin'" (by Sam & Dave), who recorded at Stax records (with the Stax rhythm section), and "Chain of Fools" (by Aretha Franklin) who recorded that song with the classic Muscle Shoals Rhythm Section at FAME Studios in Muscle Shoals, Alabama.

Two members of the rhythm section on Franklin's recording (Gene Chrisman and Tommy Cogbill) perform on Memphis Underground.

A third song, "New Orleans", was also released by R&B artist (Gary U.S. Bonds), who recorded in Virginia.

So though the only one song was certifiably of Memphis vintage, the conglomeration of young New York jazz musicians with one of the most storied Southern rhythm sections proved to be the catalyst for creating strong, fresh music that sounds like neither Memphis soul nor New York jazz. This unique sound appealed to a large audience.

Reception
The record is one of the best-selling Jazz albums of all time. Rolling Stone said "Memphis Underground is a piece of musical alchemy, a marvelously intricate combination of the "Memphis sound" and jazz lyricism".

Memphis Underground was a favorite album of writer Hunter S. Thompson, who mentions it positively in several chapters of his book Fear and Loathing on the Campaign Trail. In the article The Battle of Aspen, Thompson states that his "Freak Power" campaign used Mann's recording of "Battle Hymn of the Republic" as the background music for their commercials.

Another writer, the British author Stewart Home, as a tribute to this Mann album, titled his 2007 novel (some call it an antinovel) Memphis Underground. In the novel, Home makes multiple references to soul, northern soul and jazz soul music.

Track listing 
 "Memphis Underground" (Herbie Mann) — 7:07
 "New Orleans" (Frank Guida, Joseph Royster) — 2:07
 "Hold On, I'm Comin'" (Isaac Hayes, David Porter) — 8:52
 "Chain of Fools" (Don Covay) — 10:42
 "Battle Hymn of the Republic" (Traditional, arranged by Herbie Mann) — 7:12

Personnel 
 Herbie Mann – flute
 Reggie Young – guitar
 Bobby Emmons – organ
 Bobby Wood –  electric and acoustic piano
 Gene Chrisman – drums
 Tommy Cogbill or Mike Leech - Fender bass (individual tracks not specified)

 Also appearing on selected tracks:
 Roy Ayers – vibes, conga on "Battle Hymn of the Republic"
 Larry Coryell –  guitar
 Sonny Sharrock – guitar
 Miroslav Vitouš - Fender bass on "Hold On, I'm Comin'"
Technical
 Tom Dowd – producer and engineer
 Joel Brodsky – cover photograph
 William Albert Allard –  back liner photograph

Renditions 

In 1993, flutist Alexander Zonjic covered the title track in his album "Passion."

See also 
 1969 in music
Herbie Mann discography

References 

1969 albums
Atlantic Records albums
Herbie Mann albums
Albums produced by Tom Dowd
Albums with cover art by Joel Brodsky